George L. Rider (December 24, 1890 – August 8, 1979) was an American football, basketball, baseball, track and cross country coach and athletics administrator.  He served as the head football coach at Olivet College in 1914, at Hanover College from 1915 to 1916, at Miami University in Oxford, Ohio from 1917 to 1918, and at Washington University in St. Louis from 1920 to 1922, compiling a career college football record of 29–22–5.  At Miami he also coached basketball from 1917 to 1919, baseball from 1918 to 1919, and track and cross country from 1924 to 1960.  In addition he served as athletic director at Miami from 1924 to 1940.  In 1959 Rider served as honorary president of the International Track and Field Coaches Association.  He is a charter member of Miami University's Hall of Fame along with coaching legends including Walter Alston, Earl Blaik, Paul Brown, Weeb Ewbank, Ara Parseghian. and John Pont.

Coaching career

Football
Rider became Miami University's head coach for the 1917 and 1918 seasons because George Little was serving in the armed forces during World War I.  In his two years he never lost a game and won back to back Ohio Athletic Conference championships.  His 1917 football team outscored its opponents 202–0. This team went 6–0–2 with the only blemishes being scoreless ties with both Kentucky and Wooster.  Rider's second season was just as successful with his team going 5–0–1.  However, games against Kentucky, Wooster, and Wittenberg were canceled due to the flu pandemic.  Rider stepped down when Little returned to Oxford from the war.

Track
Rider coached  track and cross at Miami for 36 years, from 1924 to 1960. His track teams won nine Buckeye Conference titles and 10 consecutive Mid-American Conference championships. Also, his cross country teams captured nine Mid-American Conference Championships.  In 1957, Rider was selected to the Helms Athletic Foundation Track and Field Coaches Hall of Fame. Additionally, Miami's track is named in his honor for his contributions to the university athletic department.

Death
Rider died in Oxford, Ohio on August 8, 1979 at the age of 88.

Head coaching record

Football

References

External links
 

1890 births
1979 deaths
Hanover Panthers football coaches
Hanover Panthers men's basketball coaches
Miami RedHawks athletic directors
Miami RedHawks baseball coaches
Miami RedHawks football coaches
Miami RedHawks men's basketball coaches
Olivet Comets football coaches
Olivet Comets football players
Olivet Comets men's basketball coaches
Washington University Bears football coaches
College men's track and field athletes in the United States
College track and field coaches in the United States
Burials at Oxford Cemetery, Oxford, Ohio